Blue Sky (Swedish: Blå himmel) is a 1955 Swedish comedy film directed by Georg Årlin and starring Edvard Persson, Ingeborg Nyberg and Barbro Larsson.

Cast
 Edvard Persson as Fridolf Rundquist  
 Ingeborg Nyberg as Britt Kellerman  
 Barbro Larsson as Majlis Kellerman  
 Mim Persson as Mrs. Kellerman 
 Kerstin Albihn as Elsa  
 Jana Alexandersson as Student at Lundberg's class  
 Kristina Andersson as Lilian  
 Lisa Andersson as Student at Lundberg's class  
 Kenneth Bergström as Figge  
 Astrid Bodin as Fru Andersson  
 Erling Borgshammar as Yngve  
 Anders Frithiof as J.P. Alinder  
 Fred Gerle as Peter  
 Per Hjern as Galoschan, kristendomslärare  
 Ragnar Klange as Teodor Wåhlin, principal  
 Algot Larsson as Jönsson, skolvaktmästare  
 Bengt Larsson as Fridolf  
 Lena Larsson as Inga  
 Eva Lidberg as Annika  
 Hans-Åke Lindelöw as Student at Lundberg's class  
 Gerard Lindqvist as Lasse Janstad  
 Kent Malmström as Student at Lundberg's class  
 Börje Mellvig as Kommissarien  
 Lars-Göran Månsson as Student at Lundberg's class  
 Arne Mårtensson as 'Dauber' - teacher of drawing  
 Monica Nielsen as Miss Wåhlin  
 Rune Olson as Student at Lundberg's class  
 Toivo Pawlo as Hamlet, språklärare  
 Barbro Persson as Lotte  
 Eva Rydberg as Berit 
 Lillemor Segerholm as Louise  
 Björn Sjödin as Student at Lundberg's class  
 Stina Ståhle as Mrs. Wåhlin  
 Rune Turesson as Pinne - Gymnastiklärare  
 Georg Årlin as Lundberg  
 Michael Segerström as Elev

References

Bibliography 
 Qvist, Per Olov & von Bagh, Peter. Guide to the Cinema of Sweden and Finland. Greenwood Publishing Group, 2000.

External links 
 

1955 films
1955 comedy films
Swedish comedy films
1950s Swedish-language films
1950s Swedish films